Nodaway County is a county located in the northwest part of Missouri. As of the 2010 census, the population was 23,370. Its county seat is Maryville. The county was organized February 14, 1845 and is named for the Nodaway River. It is the largest in area of the counties added to Missouri in the 1836 Platte Purchase and the fourth-largest county by area in Missouri.

Nodaway County comprises the Maryville, MO Micropolitan Statistical Area.

History

The county has a rich agricultural history. It is the home of trainers Ben Jones and Jimmy Jones, whose horses won six Kentucky Derby races and two Triple Crowns.

The county is home to Northwest Missouri State University. The university's grounds were a re-creation of the landscape of the 1904 St. Louis World's Fair. In 1993, Northwest was designated by the Missouri State Legislature as the official Missouri Arboretum. ESPN has carried the university's participation in five national championship football games, three of which they won.

U.S. Supreme Court Justice Clarence Thomas studied to become a priest at Conception Seminary College, before giving it up for law. The Benedictine Sisters of Perpetual Adoration convent in neighboring Clyde has 550 relics of saints, the largest collection in the nation.

Located in Tornado Alley, many tornadoes have struck the county, including an F4 tornado on April 10, 1979, which obliterated the town of Braddyville, Iowa across the county line. Tornadoes have damaged two of the county's largest buildings, the Administration Building on the campus of Northwest Missouri State University and Conception Abbey. The 1881 Hopkins tornado is one of the first recorded F5 tornadoes.

Early life in the county was chronicled by writer Homer Croy, a Nodaway County native, in many books, articles, films and Broadway shows in the 1920s and 1930s.

Etymology

The origin of the name "Nodaway" has been attributed to a Pottawatomie name for "placid," a Dakota Sioux name for "crossed without canoe," and various tribes names for "snake."

Crime
Nodaway County was on the frontier in its earliest days and has a long history of violence.

The first execution in Nodaway County occurred in the county seat of Maryville on July 22, 1881. Two brothers, Albert P. and Charles E. Talbott, were hanged after being convicted of murdering their own father, Dr. Perry H. Talbott. Dr. Talbott, a local physician, newspaper editor, and state legislator, died on September 18, 1880, at his home northwest of Arkoe, a town he co-founded. He was found shot in his home and died of his injuries that evening, blaming his political enemies with his dying breath. Nevertheless, his sons were charged with the crime. Despite their insistence of innocence, the jury found them guilty and the judge sentenced them to death. Their tombstone in the family cemetery is a vertical column with two hands clasped in friendship. The inscription on the headstone reads: "We Died Inocent." [sic]

On December 9, 1884, Omaha Charley, whose real name was Joseph Paro, aka Charles F. Stephens, was the victim of a lynch mob. Six days earlier, he had shot Hubert Kremer in Hilgert's Saloon, in Maryville. Omaha Charley had been arrested, but others decided to take matters into their own hands. About 50 masked men broke into the jail and demanded Omaha Charley. The county sheriff, James Anderson, and his brother, Deputy Jack Anderson, fought the mob, firing shots and being fired upon in return. Ultimately, the mob overpowered the sheriff and his deputy, and dragged Omaha Charley from his cell. They carried Stephens to the bridge at Fourth and Water Streets, where they tied the rope to the bridge railing and threw him over the side. Sheriff Anderson found his prisoner there an hour later. This was not Omaha Charley's first crime, however. Five years earlier, he was convicted of 2nd degree murder in the death of John Mahan. He was sentenced to twelve years in prison. In January 1884, he was pardoned by Governor Thomas Crittenden and released, having served only four and a half years of his sentence.

One of the most notorious murders in Nodaway County was committed by Hezekiah "Hez" Rasco, a farmer's son, who was hanged on March 26, 1912, for the murder of Oda Hubbell. Rasco and Hubbell took part in an all-night poker game in a boxcar at the Barnard Depot. Hubbell returned to his family on the morning of November 20, 1910. The next day, Hubbell and his family were all found dead. Hubbell had been killed with a shotgun and his body dragged into the house. Mrs. Hubbell was beaten to death with the shotgun butt. After killing the children, the murderer set fire to the Hubbell home, which almost incinerated the children's corpses. Little more than half of the torso of Hubbell was found after a passing neighbor had extinguished the blaze.  Hez Rasco was arrested and charged with the murder of Hubbell, his wife, and their children Welton, 4, and Jessie, 6. Rasco was tried and convicted only for Oda Hubbell's murder. Rasco maintained his innocence to his death. The murders were covered in the book Hezekiah Rasco: Child of Woe — Man of Sorrow.

Raymond Gunn, was arrested for the murder and attempted rape of a young white schoolteacher. He confessed his guilt. On January 12, 1931, a mob in Maryville took Gunn from the jail and marched him to the scene of the crime. They tied him to the school roof and set fire to the building, burning Gunn to death.

On the night of October 10, 1972, Benedict “Benny” Kemper, 15 years old, cut the telephone line to the Marion Merrigan family’s house that was situated west of Conception, sneaked into the basement and waited for the family to go to sleep. Once the family was asleep, Kemper went upstairs and went from bedroom to bedroom murdering four members: Marion, the father; Kathleen, the mother; William, his classmate and their son; and Helen Ann, their youngest daughter, using a .22 bolt-action rifle. The lone surviving family member, Sue Merrigan Dorrel, was a student at Northwest Missouri State University in Maryville at the time. She is an aunt of former Northwest Missouri State University football coach Adam Dorrel. In 1973, Kemper was sentenced to four consecutive 45-year sentences for murder and an additional six years for an attempted jail escape.

On the night of August 4, 1973, Teresa "Tessie" Hilt, a student at Northwest Missouri State, was strangled and stabbed to death in her off-campus apartment in Maryville, and found the next day in her blood-soaked bed by friends. This crime has never been solved and is still considered an open/cold case by the Maryville Department of Public Safety.

On July 10, 1981, several unknown people killed Ken McElroy, in the middle of Skidmore, in what is one of the county's best-kept secrets. An abusive man suspected of many crimes and convicted of attempted murder, McElroy was shot in his truck in Skidmore's main street, in full view of a crowd. The different caliber bullets showed there had been several people involved. However, when questioned by the county sheriff, everyone insisted they had ducked under the pool table in the local bar and saw nothing. Sheriff Danny Estes remarked, "That must have been the biggest damn pool table in the world." A local and federal law enforcement task force was set up to investigate the crime, but they could not find anyone willing to step forward to discuss the crime. The book and movie In Broad Daylight are based on this event.

In 1990, BATF informant Christine Elkins disappeared. She was beaten to death by cousins Tony and Steven "Tug" Emery, joined by an unnamed associate. Elkins' body was wrapped in a carpet rug, thrown into the trunk of her car, and driven to the Missouri River. The Emerys used a board to hold the steering column in place and another piece to hold down the accelerator, and ran the car off a boat ramp near Nodaway. The car was found in 1997, with Elkins' bones in the trunk. Dental records identified the remains. Tony Emery was sentenced to life imprisonment without possibility of parole, and is currently incarcerated at United States Penitentiary (USP) in Terre Haute, Indiana. He appealed the conviction, which was affirmed in 1999. Tug Emery is incarcerated on charges related to the murder at Federal Correctional Institution in Sandstone, Minnesota and has a projected release date of June 21, 2016.

In the fall of 1994, a local farmer, William Taylor, murdered his wife Debra, by using the family's cat to lure her underneath a combine and causing the combine to roll over her. Taylor told authorities that he had killed the cat with a hammer and threw it under the combine, to lure his wife under the machine. Once she was under the combine attempting to retrieve the cat, he used twine to pull a lever on the combine, to cause it to roll over his wife when she tried to retrieve it. After he ran over her, he stated that he had moved the combine back from his wife's body, hid the twine and called 9-1-1, stating that there had been an accident at his farm south of Maryville. Taylor was convicted of murder and received a 25-year sentence.

In the spring of 1995, Dennis Lee Jones, of Maryville, assaulted and murdered Karen Hawkins, a student at Northwest Missouri State, and a friend of his since high school at Maryville. Jones sexually assaulted her, killed her by strangulation and stomping/kicking her, then dumped her body in the 102 River east of Maryville, near the Maryville City Dog Pound, where it was recovered days later downstream by the Missouri State Water Patrol (now part of the Missouri State Highway Patrol). Before Jones could go to trial, he hanged himself in the Nodaway County Jail.

On October 16, 2000, Greg N. Dragoo beat and dragged his girlfriend, Wendy Gillenwater, down several country roads outside of Skidmore, causing her to die. Gillenwater's body was found outside her Skidmore home. Dragoo was charged with murder and given a life sentence by a Nodaway County judge. Dragoo is currently incarcerated in the Jefferson City Correctional Center.

On April 11, 2001, Branson Perry was last seen in his home in the 300 block of West Oak Street in Skidmore, at around 3:00 p.m. He went outside to put some jumper cables in a shed. He never returned, and has never been heard from again. The Missouri State Highway Patrol and the Nodaway County Sheriff's Office still have an open/active case on this.

On June 6, 2001, 71-year-old Lloyd Robert Jeffress, of Kearney, wielding two semi-automatic rifles, opened fire in the hallways of the Conception Abbey, murdering two monks and wounding two others, before committing suicide in the chapel. The victims were identified as the Rev. Philip Schuster, 85, and Brother Damian Larson, 64. Schuster was a greeter at the monastery's front door; Larson worked as a weatherman/groundskeeper. The Rev. Kenneth Reichert, 68, an assistant to the abbot, was shot in the stomach and was in serious condition. The Rev. Norbert Schappler, 73, who was shot twice, was listed in stable condition. Schappler oversees the dining room and works as director at the printing house.

On December 16, 2004, Bobbie Jo Stinnett was murdered in her home in Skidmore, and had her unborn baby cut from her womb. Lisa Montgomery was located (along with the baby named Victoria Jo) due to computer forensic evidence, in Melvern, Kansas, where she was arrested by the FBI, a Maryville Public Safety Detective, and a detective from the Cameron Police Dept. Montgomery was convicted of Stinnett's murder and sentenced to death in 2007 by a Federal Court in the Western District of Missouri. Victoria Jo was re-united with her father Zeb. Montgomery was executed on January 13, 2021</ref>

On November 16, 2007, Erik B. Romig and Nicholas A. Rosencrans, both of Maryville, got into an altercation with Donald Ray Gardner Jr, also of Maryville, over $40 at a house on the east side of town. Gardner was taken from the house, beaten, then dragged to a field 1-2 blocks away, where he was left to die. Roming and Rosencrans were found guilty and both sentenced to seven years in prison for manslaughter.

On December 3, 2007, Jorge Saavedra Pere, of Saint Joseph, fatally shot his roommate, Jamie Zamudio-Hernandez, in the kitchen of the Mandarin Restaurant in Maryville, where they both worked, over a money dispute. Saavedra fled the scene in a stolen car and was found several days later by authorities near Mankato, Minnesota, on foot after the vehicle he stole ran out of gas. Saavedra was found guilty of voluntary manslaughter in a Nodaway County court and sentenced to 12 years in a Missouri prison.

On October 29, 2011, three people were killed and four people were injured in a motor vehicle accident on Missouri Highway 246, half a mile east of Hopkins, when the driver over-corrected after losing control of his pick-up, causing it to flip over several times, then catch fire in a field. The victims were 21-year-old Joshua Bix and 22-year-old Benjamin McIntyre, both of Hopkins, Missouri, and 18-year-old Chrystal Olerich of Lake View, Iowa. All three were thrown from the pickup, and none were wearing seatbelts. The driver of the pickup, 22-year-old Scott R. Woods, of Hopkins, and three other victims, were tossed from the truck and seriously injured, but survived. Woods was sentenced on January 9, 2013, to 10 years in a Missouri prison for two felony counts of involuntary manslaughter and three charges of felony assault.

On Sept 13, 2012, Kevin Dell Mooney, 31, and Tony Overlin, 23, both of Bethany, ambushed Northwest Missouri State University student Tomarken Smith, 21, of Jennings, outside a local bar as Smith exited the establishment. Mooney and Overlin attacked and beat him, knocking him to the sidewalk. Smith fell, struck his head on the pavement, and was knocked unconscious, causing him to stop breathing. Maryville Public Safety Officers were on scene within seconds of the altercation and immediately began CPR, but were unable to revive him. Smith was pronounced dead at 2:21 a.m. Mooney and Overlin were picked up moments after the altercation by other Maryville Public Safety Officers and taken into custody, and booked into the Nodaway County Jail. They were both charged with second-degree murder and first-degree assault On September 3, 2013, Mooney pleaded guilty to involuntary manslaughter in Atchison County Circuit Court for his role in the death. 
On September 4, 2013, in the Circuit Court of Buchanan County, Overlin was sentenced to serve six years in prison by Judge Patrick Robb, after Overlin was found guilty of the Class C felony of involuntary manslaughter. On September 30, 2013, Mooney was sentenced to six years in prison. "Both Law Enforcement and Tomarken's family were involved from the very beginning and agreed the final outcome of this case was just and appropriate," said Robert Rice, Prosecuting Attorney of Nodaway County, Missouri. Tomarken's family and several law enforcement officials attended the court hearing.

On June 27, 2013, Steve Parsons, owner of Parsons Tires in Maryville and Stanberry, committed suicide in a Nodaway County Courthouse courtroom, using a cyanide capsule that he had purchased online several days before. Parsons secretly slid the capsule into his mouth, after hearing he would be sent to prison for seven years for being guilty of the statutory sodomy of a 14-year-old girl, who was his babysitter. Parsons had a seizure in court and was transported by EMS to Heartland Regional Hospital ER in Saint Joseph. While en route, Parsons went into cardiac arrest, and was pronounced dead by the local coroner upon arrival.

On September 6, 2013, Matthew Rouch, 57, of Maryville, an instructor of Mass Media at Northwest Missouri State University, was arrested after staff from the Mass Media Department notified University Police of a Facebook post, where Mr. Rouch threatened, “By October, I’ll be wanting to get up to the top of the bell tower with a high-powered rifle, with a good scope and probably a gatling gun as well." University Police and the Nodaway County Sheriff's Department determined the comment was made in jest, but discovered a sophisticated marijuana growing operation in the process of searching Mr. Rouch’s house, after Rouch made a statement that there "was a bomb in a brief case at his house." Rouch was charged with one count of felony production of a controlled substance, and one count of felony possession of a controlled substance. The university placed Rouch on administrative leave, pending the outcome of an internal investigation. Other professors will assume Rouch’s teaching duties in the interim. Rouch appeared in Nodaway County Circuit Court for his initial arraignment October 8, 2013. He will return to court November 12, 2013. However, the warrant  was ultimately declared illegal when it was found that Clarence Green, the campus Chief of Police, had withheld critical information and that there was no probable cause. Although that decision was appealed, a three judge appeals court unanimously ruled in Rouch's favor, and the charges were dismissed.

Geography
It is the fifth-largest county in Missouri by area. Iowa forms the northern border of Nodaway County.

Adjacent counties
Page County, Iowa (northwest)
Taylor County, Iowa (north)
Worth County (northeast)
Gentry County (southeast)
Andrew County (south)
Holt County (southwest)
Atchison County (west)

Demographics

As of the census of 2000, there were 21,912 people, 8,138 households, and 4,817 families residing in the county.  The population density was 25 people per square mile (10/km2).  There were 8,909 housing units at an average density of 10 per square mile (4/km2).  The racial makeup of the county was 96.58% White, 1.35% Black or African American, 0.23% Native American, 0.87% Asian, 0.02% Pacific Islander, 0.21% from other races, and 0.74% from two or more races. Approximately 0.71% of the population were Hispanic or Latino of any race.

There were 8,138 households, out of which 27.30% had children under the age of 18 living with them, 50.00% were married couples living together, 6.20% had a female householder with no husband present, and 40.80% were non-families. 30.00% of all households were made up of individuals, and 11.60% had someone living alone who was 65 years of age or older.  The average household size was 2.33 and the average family size was 2.94.

In the county, the population was spread out, with 19.40% under the age of 18, 25.10% from 18 to 24, 23.10% from 25 to 44, 18.60% from 45 to 64, and 13.80% who were 65 years of age or older.  The median age was 30 years. For every 100 females there were 99.70 males.  For every 100 females age 18 and over, there were 97.00 males.

The median income for a household in the county was $31,781, and the median income for a family was $42,203. Males had a median income of $28,388 versus $21,267 for females. The per capita income for the county was $15,384.  About 8.30% of families and 16.50% of the population were below the poverty line, including 11.20% of those under age 18 and 13.30% of those age 65 or over.

2020 Census

Transportation

Major highways
 U.S. Route 71
 U.S. Route 136
 Route 46
 Route 113
 Route 148
 Route 246

Airport
Nodaway County is served by Northwest Missouri Regional Airport in Maryville, which is a general aviation airport with no commercial service.

Education

Public schools
Jefferson C-123 School District – Conception Junction
Jefferson Elementary School (PK-06)
Jefferson High School (07-12)
Maryville R-II School District – Maryville
Eugene Field Elementary School (PK-04)
Maryville Middle School (05-08)
Maryville High School (09-12)
Nodaway-Holt R-VII School District – Graham
Nodaway-Holt Elementary School (K-06)
Nodaway-Holt Junior/Senior High School (07-12)
North Nodaway County R-VI School District – Hopkins
North Nodaway County Elementary School (PK-05)
North Nodaway County Junior/Senior High School (06-12)
Northeast Nodaway County R-V School District – Ravenwood
Parnell Elementary School (PK-06)
Northeast Nodaway County High School (07-12)
South Nodaway County R-IV School District – Barnard
South Nodaway County Elementary School (PK-06)
South Nodaway County High School (07-12)
West Nodaway County R-I School District – Burlington Junction
West Nodaway County Elementary School (PK-06)
West Nodaway County High School (07-12)

Private schools
St. Gregory Barbarigo School – Maryville (K-09) – Catholic

Post-secondary
Northwest Missouri State University – Maryville – A public, four-year university.

Public libraries
Maryville Public Library

Politics

Local
The Democratic Party controls politics at the local level in Nodaway County. Democrats hold all but four of the elected positions in the county.

State

All of Nodaway County is a part of Missouri’s 1st District in the Missouri House of Representatives and is represented by  Allen Andrews  (R-Grant City).

All of Nodaway County is a part of Missouri’s 12th District in the Missouri Senate and is currently represented by Dan Hegeman (R-Cosby).

Federal

All of Nodaway County is included in Missouri’s 6th Congressional District and is currently represented by Sam Graves (R-Tarkio) in the U.S. House of Representatives.

Points of interest
Missouri State Arboretum
Mozingo Lake
Conception Abbey
Benedictine Sisters of Perpetual Adoration
Maryville Treatment Center
Nodaway County Historical Society Museum

Media
The four licensed broadcast stations originating in the county broadcast from Maryville:
 KNIM - 1580 - AM
 KVVL - 97.1 - FM
 KXCV - 90.5 - FM
 KZLX-FM - 106.7 - FM

Communities

Cities

Barnard
Burlington Junction
Clearmont
Conception Junction
Elmo
Graham
Hopkins
Maryville (county seat)
Parnell
Pickering
Ravenwood
Skidmore

Villages
Arkoe
Clyde
Guilford

Census-designated place
Conception

Other unincorporated places

 Allison
 Bedison
 Bell Grove
 Dawsonville
 Gaynor
 Orrsburg
 Possum Walk
 Pumpkin Center
 Quitman
 Roseberry
 Whitecloud
 Wilcox

Notable residents

 Sarah Caldwell (1924-2006) - Boston was an American opera conductor, impresario, and stage director.
 Dale Carnegie (1888-1955) - author of How to Win Friends and Influence People
 Charles J. Colden (1870-1938) - U.S. Representative
 Homer Croy (1883-1965) - author and screenwriter who wrote about life in Maryville
 Albert David (1902-1945) - Medal of Honor winner for capture of  during World War II
 Forrest C. Donnell (1884–1980) - native of Quitman; Republican Governor from 1941 to 1945 and U.S. Senator from 1945 to 1951
 Herbert Hoover (1874–1964) - President of the United States; was never a true county resident, but he owned a farm south of Graham
 Ben A. Jones (1882-1961) and his son Horace A. "Jimmy" Jones (1906-2001) had a farm near Parnell and retired there. During their tenure at Calumet Farm, they trained six Kentucky Derby and two Triple Crown winners. Extensive memorabilia from the racing days are in the Nodaway County Historical Society Museum.
 Henry L. Jost (1873–1950) - Mayor of Kansas City, who arrived in Hopkins aboard an orphan train
 Edward H. Moore (1871-1950) - U.S. Senator from Oklahoma
 Albert P. Morehouse (1835–1891) - Maryville resident who succeeded to Governor from 1887 to 1889
 Harley Race (1943-2019) - professional wrestler
 Marcus Morton Rhoades (1903-1991) - cytogeneticist
 Grant Wallace (1867-1954) - writer of the occult
 Jerry Wallace (1928-2008) -  pop-country singer and actor

See also
 National Register of Historic Places listings in Nodaway County, Missouri

References

Further reading
 Past and present of Nodaway County, Missouri (2 vol 1910) vol 1 online' vol 2 online
 Baumli, Joseph Walden, "Prairie Trails, Iron Rails, and Tall Tales: The Settling, Town Building, and People of Nodaway County, Missouri, 1839-1910" (PhD dissertation, University of Missouri, Kansas City, 2004). ProCite Order No. DA3145964.

External links
Nodaway County Historical Society
Rootsweb, Nodaway County, Missouri
 Digitized 1930 Plat Book of Nodaway County  from University of Missouri Division of Special Collections, Archives, and Rare Books
 2010 Census statistics

 
1845 establishments in Missouri
Missouri placenames of Native American origin
Populated places established in 1845